The GE 44-ton switcher is a four-axle diesel-electric locomotive built by General Electric between 1940 and 1956. It was designed for industrial and light switching duties, often replacing steam locomotives that had previously been assigned these chores. 

This locomotive's specific 44-short ton weight was directly related to one of the efficiencies the new diesel locomotives offered compared to their steam counterparts: reduced labor intensity. In the 1940s, the steam to diesel transition was in its infancy in North America, and railroad unions were trying to protect the locomotive fireman jobs that were redundant with diesel units. One measure taken to this end was the 1937 so-called "90,000 Pound Rule," a stipulation that locomotives weighing  – 45 short tons – or more required a fireman in addition to an engineer on common carrier railroads. Industrial and military railroads had no such stipulation. The 44-ton locomotive was designed to abrogate this requirement. Other manufacturers also built 44-ton switchers of center-cab configuration.

GE built 276 of this locomotive for U. S. railroads and industrial concerns, four were exported to Australia in 1944, 10 were exported to Canada, 10 were exported to Cuba, one was exported to the Dominican Republic, five were exported to France, three were exported to India, six were exported to Mexico, five were exported to Saudi Arabia, one was exported to Sweden, two were exported to Trinidad, 10 were exported to Uruguay, and 57 were built for the United States Armed Forces. Many remain, in service and in museums.

Prime mover options 
The locomotives were available with a choice of prime movers. Most were built with a pair of Caterpillar's D17000 V8  engines, but three other engine types were used. Nine were built with a pair of Hercules DFXD engines; two were sold to Chattanooga Traction  and seven were sold to Missouri Pacific Railroad and its subsidiaries. Ten were built with a pair of the slightly more powerful Buda 6DH1742, rated at  each. The last four locomotives built had Caterpillar D342 engines, of which three were sold to Canadian National Railway  and one to the Dansville and Mount Morris Railroad.

Military version 
During the Second World War, GE produced a "Drop Cab" variant of the 44-ton locomotives for the US Armed Forces. These appeared similar to the standard 44-ton but had a lower cab for European clearances, and large boxes next to the cab, on the front right, and back left running boards, housing the air compressors (housed under the cab on standard versions). Most of these military variants were ballasted to an actual weight of 45 tons. A total of 91 Military 45-ton Drop Cabs were built with 31 of those sold to the Indian Railways. Additional narrow gauge drop cabs were built to a 47-ton rating for the military and export.

Numbered 1101 to 1112, after some initial use as light road engines, they spent most of their lives as switchers at the southern region main stations. The series is withdrawn but one example is preserved at the National Railroad Museum (Fundação Museu Nacional Ferroviário Armando Ginestal Machado) at Entroncamento.

Australia 
Forty-seven locomotives were bought by the US Military, and four of them were exported to Australia. All saw service on the New South Wales Government Railways as the 79 class, before two of them were sold to Commonwealth Railways, becoming the DE class.

Preserved examples

United States 
Arcade and Attica Railroad in Arcade, NY shifted all operations to diesel in 1941 with the purchase of 44ton No 110. Six years later a wreck forced them to send the engine back to Erie for repairs. At that time they purchased a second engine (ARA No 111) and scrapped their last remaining backup steam engine. ARA 110 today is a static display while ARA 111 remains operational for freight duties as a backup locomotive, occasionally hauling the railroad's excursion trains (often triple-headed with the railroad's other two GE centercab switchers for their annual WWII weekend, #112 and #113). Freight duties are currently handled in tandem by 65-ton #112 (1945 b/n 27886, U.S. Navy, acquired 1988) and 80-ton #113 (1959 b/n 33489, ConEdison, acquired 2014).
 The Burlington Junction Railway of Burlington, IA owns an ex-Washington and Old Dominion Railroad, Fonda, Johnstown and Gloversville Railroad and Great Western Railway of Colorado 44 tonner (BJRY 44) that operates about once a month in West Burlington, Iowa.
 The California State Railroad Museum in Old Sacramento runs the Sacramento Southern Railroad Number 1240, formerly the U.S. Air Force Number 1240 out of McClellan Air Force Base.
 The Charlotte Southern in Charlotte, MI. operates the last 44 ton GE ever built. Ex-Danville & Mount Morris #1. List in the Diesel Spotters Guide (Kalmbach Publishing).
The Chehalis-Centralia Railroad operates former Puget Sound Naval Shipyard #6. The locomotive is used for yard switching, MOW, and as a backup.
 The Cumbres and Toltec Scenic Railroad operates two 3-foot gauge 44 tonners for switching and maintenance, numbered 15 and 19, which came from the Oahu Railroad.
 The Danbury Railway Museum in Danbury, CT has two of these locos one under restoration (ex New Haven Railroad) and one currently operational (ex Union Pacific)
 The Delaware & Ulster Railroad currently has former Western Maryland 76 in storage at their yard in Arkville, New York.
 The Florida Gulf Coast Railroad Museum in Parrish, Florida owns and operates former US Navy 65-00345, originally assigned to NAS Jacksonville.
 The Heber Valley Railroad in Heber City, UT has one of these in operation giving daily tourist trips down Provo Canyon in Utah
 The Indiana Transportation Museum in Noblesville, IN owns former Nickel Plate Road 44T #91
 The New York Ontario & Western Railroad Historical Society, Owns one, NYO&W #105. Currently being Repaired & Restored for Operation by the end of 2018. It is at Steamtown National Historic Site, in Scranton, Pennsylvania. This unit was SRNJ #105 Prior to 2017, when the NYO&WHS had acquired it, and it was transported by truck to Scranton.
  The North Florida Railway Museum has 44-Tonner #12945 on display in Reynolds Industrial Park located, Green Cove Springs, FL. The locomotive is currently being cosmetically and mechanically restored.
The Pacific Locomotive Association in Sunol, CA owns ATSF 462 which is out of service awaiting restoration.  It is stored at PLA's Brightside Yard in Niles Canyon, CA.
 The Portsmouth Naval Shipyard still operates USN 65-00566.
The Media:The Railway Museum of San Angelo in San Angelo, TX displays the GE 44 ton repainted and lettered in Santa Fe Tiger Strips as number 461 was formerly the U.S. Air Force 1241, serial number 31879, formerly based at Carswell Air Force Base, Texas. Build date February 1953.
 The Roundhouse Railroad Museum in Savannah, Georgia acquired the ex-B&M No. 119 and ex-US Army 7069 (pictured) from the Claremont Concord Railroad in 2010.
 The Southeastern Railway Museum at Duluth, Georgia has the former New York, Ontario and Western Railway #104, and Hartwell Railway #2
 The Southern Michigan Railroad Society in Clinton, MI operates former Western Maryland Railway unit #75 on tourist trips between Clinton, Tecumseh, and Raisin Center along the former Jacksonburgh and Palmyra Railroad.  It also preserves former Detroit and Mackinac Railway #10. 
 The Southern Railroad of New Jersey currently rosters two 44-tonners. Numbers 410 & 412
The Stewartstown Railroad operates a former Coudersport & Port Allegheny 44 tonner.
 The Timber Heritage Association in Samoa, California owns the Arcata and Mad River #101, a 44 tonner which used to haul lumber loads from Korbel to Arcata, California on the Arcata and Mad River Railroad. This unit is operational, and is part of the planned Humboldt Bay Scenic Railroad for tourists using the non-operational Northwestern Pacific Railroad around Humboldt Bay.
 The Toledo, Lake Erie, and Western owns one Whitcomb 44-tonner, #1, Ex-Dundee Cement 951901, and née-Ann Arbor Railroad #1. Currently, it is sitting in its yard in Grand Rapids, Ohio, along with a Baldwin 0-6-0 steam locomotive. Both are currently being restored.
The Walkersville Southern Railroad currently has three 44 tonners; those being Great Northern #51, Former Strasburg/Pennsylvania Railroad 9331, and Former Pennsylvania 9339. Three additional examples are expected to arrive on the property by the fall of 2020. Currently, two are privately owned ex-Pennsylvania Railroad 44-tonners, 9339, acquired from the South Carolina Railroad Museum in 2011 and ex-PRR 44-Tonner 9331, acquired form Strasburg Railroad in 2013.
The Wanamaker, Kempton and Southern Railroad owns and operates one on excursions on the weekends.
 The Western Pacific Railroad Museum at Portola, California is the home of Quincy Railroad 3 . No. 3 was leased by the Virginia and Truckee Railroad in Virginia City, Nevada in 2002 when its two steam locomotives went down for restoration. It was sent back when the railroad got another GE switcher.  This 44 ton engine replaced steam power on this shortline railroad.  The WPRM is also home to Quincy 4, an Alco S1 switcher that replaced QRR 3.  The WPRM recently received a donation of 44 tonner Tidewater Southern 735.
 The Western Railway Museum near Suisun, CA. is the home of Sacramento Northern 146, Visalia Electric 502 and Salt Lake, Garfield and Western (Saltair) DS-2. The 502 is operational. The 146 is now undergoing restoration, Saltair DS-2 is on display and may be restored later.

Canada 
 Southern Prairie Railway in Ogema, Saskatchewan, Canada has purchased former Maine Central Railroad #15 from Conway Scenic Railway in New Hampshire and intends to use the 1945 44-tonner to offer tourist trips down the Red Coat Line in Southern Saskatchewan.
 The Musquodoboit Harbour Railway Museum in Musquodoboit Harbour, Nova Scotia features a former Canadian National Railways 44-ton unit.
 Port Stanley Terminal Rail, operating out of Port Stanley, Ontario, rosters one example. Serial number 28349, formerly of the Greater Winnipeg Water District, is number L3 and named 'Winnie'.

Sweden 
 The two 44-tonners from the ironworks in Hofors and Domnarvet are preserved by a railway society in Falun, Dalarna.

Australia 

7921 which was sold to Commonwealth Railways as DE90 is preserved by the NSWRTM at Thrilmere and renumbered as 7921.
DE91 which was 7922 with the NSWGR which was sold to Commonwealth Railways is preserved at the National Railway Museum in Port Adelaide, South Australia. It was cosmetically restored in 2014 to the Commonwealth Railways Blue Black livery.

Spain 
Hunosa Nº2, which used to work at the Sueros Coal Washing Facility in Mieres, Asturias, is in operational condition at the Asturian Railway Museum in Gijón, Asturias.

References

Extra 2200 South Issues 51 March April 1975 and 52 May June 1975
https://www.strasburgrailroad.com/dig-deeper/equipment-roster/ Equipment Roster
http://rgusrail.com/utshferc.html

External links

 GE44-ton roster
 http://www.thedieselshop.us/GE_44Ton-Military.HTML
 GE44-ton pictures

44-ton switcher
B-B locomotives
Diesel-electric locomotives of the United States
Railway locomotives introduced in 1940
 
Standard gauge locomotives of the United States
Standard gauge locomotives of Australia
Standard gauge locomotives of Canada
5 ft 6 in gauge locomotives
Standard gauge locomotives of Saudi Arabia
Standard gauge locomotives of France
Standard gauge locomotives of Sweden
Diesel-electric locomotives of Canada
Diesel-electric locomotives of Saudi Arabia
Diesel-electric locomotives of France
Diesel-electric locomotives of Sweden